Alexander Berzin may refer to:

 Aleksandr Berzin (born 1946), Soviet and Russian sailor, Hero of the Russian Federation
 Alexander Berzin (scholar) (born 1944), Buddhist scholar and author